B2 First, previously known as Cambridge English: First and the First Certificate in English (FCE), is an English language examination provided by Cambridge Assessment English (previously known as Cambridge English Language Assessment and University of Cambridge ESOL examinations).

B2 First shows that learners have the language skills needed to communicate confidently in an English-speaking environment. It is targeted at Level B2 of the Common European Framework of Reference (CEFR).

B2 First is one of the examinations in Cambridge English Qualifications, each of which aligns with a particular level of the CEFR.

There are Cambridge English Qualifications for schools, general and higher education, and business. B2 First is offered in two versions, B2 First for Schools, for school-aged learners, and B2 First, for general and higher education adult learners.

History

B2 First (previously known as the Lower Certificate in English (LCE), First Certificate in English (FCE) and Cambridge English: First) was originally launched in 1939.

The arrival of thousands of refugees from the Spanish Civil War and occupied Europe into the UK had created a growing need for language assessment. One hundred and forty-four students sat the first LCE exam on 21 June 1939. The exam was divided into three sections:
 Oral (Dictation, Reading Aloud, and Conversation)
 English Composition and Language (2 hours for a free composition on a choice of subjects and various tests on the correct use of simple English)
 Prescribed Texts (2 hours on Dickens, Swift, Shaw and/or the Oxford English Coursebook).

By 1943, the exam included a choice between ‘either prescribed texts or a paper in translation from and into English’. By 1944, 18 languages were catered for in the translation paper, including Polish, Arabic, Hebrew, Czech, Persian and Swedish.

Many of those who took the exam served on active duty during World War II. The December 1943 exam pass list includes candidates from the Polish Army, the Polish Institute of Air Force Technology (RAF), the Netherlands Fleet Air Arm, and the Czechoslovak RAF Squadron. On one day in 1948 over 2,500 men and women of the Polish Resettlement Corps took the exam.

A special version of the exam was also made available to prisoners of war detained in Britain and in occupied Europe. The test was made available to 1,500 prisoners of war in Britain, 900 of them Italians. In Germany, the test was offered at seven prisoners of war camps, with Indian prisoners of war encouraged to take the exam and/or School Certificate exams.
After the war, the exam proved to be the most popular Cambridge English exam of the time, with over 4,000 candidates in 1947, compared to 2,028 candidates for the Certificate of Proficiency in English, now known as C2 Proficiency.

In 1975, driven by evolving principles of communicative language teaching and testing, the exam was revised. The qualification was further updated in 1984 and 1996. Following the 1996 revision, the exam covered a greater range of writing, listening and speaking micro-skills. Its Speaking test format used two candidates and two examiners and the five papers were equally weighted, each representing 20% of the available marks.

In January 2015, another set of revisions was introduced. The main changes were: the overall exam is now 30 minutes shorter; there are four exam papers, instead of five; and the Reading and Use of English papers have been combined into a single paper.

B2 First and B2 First for Schools

B2 First is available in two versions:
 B2 First, designed for adult learners. B2 First is one of the exams that make up Cambridge English Qualifications for general and higher education.
 B2 First for Schools, designed for school-aged learners. B2 First for Schools is one of the exams that make up Cambridge English Qualifications for schools.

B2 First and B2 First for Schools both have the same exam format (e.g. number of papers, number of questions, time allowance), both support learners to develop real-life communication skills, and both versions lead to the same certificate.

The exams use different topics and content:
 B2 First is targeted at the interests and experiences of adult learners and is designed to support learners whatever their goals – whether they want to get into university, start their own business or develop their career.
 B2 First for Schools is designed specifically for school-aged students and is informed by research into how children develop language skills. The topics and tasks in the exam are designed to reinforce the learning students do in class.

Format

Both versions of the exam (B2 First and B2 First for Schools) are made up of four papers, which cover all the key language skills (Reading and Use of Language, Writing, Listening, and Speaking).

The Speaking paper is taken face-to-face. Candidates have the choice of taking the Reading and Use of English paper, Writing paper and Listening paper on either a computer or on paper.

Reading and Use of English 
Duration: 1 hour and 15 minutes

The Reading and Use of English paper has seven parts and 52 questions. The paper contains texts totalling approximately 3,000 to 3,500 words and candidates are expected to understand different types of text, such as fiction, newspapers and magazines, promotional and informational materials.

In Parts 1–4, candidates read a range of texts and complete tasks that test their knowledge of grammar use of English and vocabulary.
 Part 1 has eight multiple-choice questions related to vocabulary in a text.
 Parts 2 and 3 involve completing gaps in a text (i.e. choosing / forming the correct word for each gap).
 Each question in Part 4 has a sentence and a ‘key’ word, which must be used to complete a second sentence so that it has the same meaning as the first sentence.

In Parts 5–7, candidates read a range of texts and complete tasks that test their reading ability.
 Part 5 involves answering multiple-choice questions about a text, with candidates expected to be able to read a text for detail, opinion, tone, purpose, main idea, implication and attitude.
 Part 6 involves choosing paragraphs to fill the gaps in a text, with candidates expected to demonstrate an understanding of the structure and development of a text.
 Part 7 involves matching statements to the correct part of a text or several short texts, with candidates expected to demonstrate reading for specific information, detail, opinion and attitude.

Writing 
Duration: 1 hours and 20 minutes

The Writing paper has two parts.

 Part 1 has one compulsory question and involves writing an essay.
 In Part 2, candidates are given three options and are asked to write one of the following using between 140 and 190 words: an article, email/letter, report, or review.

Listening 
Duration: about 40 minutes

The Listening paper has four parts and includes a mixture of monologues and dialogues from a range of familiar sources, such as news programmes, radio broadcasts, speeches and public announcements.

Candidates are expected to demonstrate a wide range of listening skills needed for real-life purposes, such as understanding the gist of an extract, listening for specific information, and understanding a speaker's opinion, attitude or feeling.

 In Part 1, candidates listen to a series of unrelated recordings (approx. 30 seconds each) and answer one multiple-choice question for each recording.
 In Part 2, candidates listen to a monologue or a dialogue with two or more speakers (approx. 3 minutes) and complete sentences on the question paper using the information they heard in the recording.
 In Part 3, candidates listen to a series of statements and related monologues (approx. 30 seconds each) and choose which statement best matches what each speaker says.
 In Part 4, candidates listen to a recording with two or more speakers (approx. 3 minutes) and answer seven multiple-choice questions.

Speaking 
Duration: 13 minutes

The Speaking test has four parts and is conducted face-to-face, with one or two other candidates and two examiners. Candidates are expected to be able to participate in discussions, express opinions, exchange ideas and reach decisions through negotiation.

 Part 1 is a short conversation with the examiner. The interlocutor will ask the candidates a series of basic personal questions about their lives, focusing on areas such as work, leisure activities and plans. Candidates are expected to respond to the examiner's questions, give basic personal information about themselves and use general social and interactional language. This part of the exam is done individually, thus the candidate only interact with the interlocutor. However, the candidates should pay attention to what the other candidate has been asked, as the question may be repeated.
 Part 2 (1 minute ‘long turn’ for each candidate, plus a 30-second response from the second candidate) involves speaking for 1 minute without interruption. Each candidate is asked to compare two colour photographs and comment about the photographs in response to a task read out by the examiner and a quick question written above the photographs. The listening candidate is also asked to comment briefly after their partner's long turn.
 Part 3 (3 minutes) is a two-way conversation between the candidates. The candidates are given spoken instructions and visual stimuli, which are used in a decision-making task. There is no right or wrong answer to the task. The candidates are expected to express and justify opinions, evaluating and speculating, in order to work towards a negotiated decision.
 Part 4 (4 minutes) is a discussion between the candidates and the examiner on topics related to the collaborative task in Part 3. The examiner directs the interaction by asking questions which encourage the candidates to broaden and discuss further the topics introduced in Part 3. The questions ask primarily for evaluation rather than for information and give candidates an opportunity to show they can discuss issues in more depth than in earlier parts of the test.

Scoring

In January 2015, Cambridge English Scale scores replaced the candidate profile and standardised scores used for pre-2015 results. All candidates (pre- and post-2015) receive a Statement of Results, with those scoring high enough also receiving a certificate.

Scoring from January 2015

Since 2015, the Statement of Results and the Certificate have the following information about the candidate's performance:
 A score on the Cambridge English Scale for each skill (Reading, Writing, Listening and Speaking) and for Use of English
 A score on the Cambridge English Scale for the overall exam
 A grade (A, B, C, Level B1) for the overall exam
 A CEFR level for the overall exam.

The certificate also contains the UK National Qualifications Framework (NQF) level.

The candidate's overall score is averaged from the individual scores for each skill (Reading, Writing, Listening and Speaking) and for the use of English.

B2 First is targeted at CEFR Level B2, but also provides reliable assessment at the level above B2 (Level C1) and the level below (B1). The following scores are used to report results:

Scores between 122 and 139 are also reported on the Statement of Results but candidates will not receive a certificate.

Scoring pre-2015

Pre-2015, the Statement of Results had the following information, reflecting the total combined score from all four papers:
 A grade (A, B, C, Level B1) for the overall exam
 A score (out of 100) for the overall exam
 A CEFR level for the overall exam.

Pre-2015, the Statement of Results also had a Candidate Profile, which showed the candidate's performance on each of the individual papers against the following scale: exceptional, good, borderline and weak.

Pre-2015, candidates who achieved a score of 45 or more (out of 100) received a certificate.

Timing and results

Candidates take the Reading and Use of English, Writing and Listening papers on the same day. The Speaking exam may be taken on the same day, but is more usually taken a few days before or after the other papers.

The paper-based exam and computer-based exam are offered at test centres throughout the calendar year.

Successful candidates receive two documents: a Statement of Results and a Certificate. Universities, employers and other organisations may require either of these documents as proof of English language skills.

An online Statement of Results is available to candidates four to six weeks after the paper-based exam and two weeks after the computer-based exam. Successful candidates (those scoring above 140 on the Cambridge English Scale) receive a hard-copy certificate within three months of the paper-based exam and within six weeks of the computer-based exam.

Usage
B2 First demonstrates language proficiency at Level B2 of the Common European Framework of Reference (CEFR) and is used for study and work purposes.

It is an upper-intermediate qualification used to demonstrate that a candidate can use everyday written and spoken English for work and study purposes. By taking up and passing the B2 First (formerly known as FCE First Certificate Exam), the candidate certifies that they can understand the main ideas of complex communication, interact with some degree of fluency and spontaneity without great difficulty, engage in discussion in both familiar and unfamiliar situations, interact spontaneously without too much trouble, and communicate in detail, appropriate to the purpose and audience. According to this level of English, the candidates have the language skills to communicate in English, travel, live and work independently in an English-speaking country. They should also be able to participate in face-to-face discussions, follow the news on English-speaking TV/radio channels and websites, podcast, write emails, texts, letters, reports, stories, essays and the like.

A significant number of higher education institutions accept B2 First for admissions or exemption purposes. This includes universities based in:
 Australia (e.g. Box Hill Institute)
 Canada (e.g. Thompson Rivers University)
 Germany (e.g. Freie Universität Berlin)
 Hong Kong (e.g. City University of Hong Kong)
 Netherlands (e.g. University of Amsterdam)
 USA (e.g. The Illinois Institute of Art, Chicago).

Many companies worldwide accept B2 First as part of their recruitment processes or use it for training and development. These include Deloitte, Ernst & Young, HSBC, Marks & Spencers, and Nestlé.

See also
 Cambridge Assessment English
 Cambridge English Qualifications
 A2 Key
 B1 Preliminary
 C1 Advanced
 C2 Proficiency

References

External links 
 Website for B2 First
 Website for B2 First for Schools

Standardized tests for English language
English-language education
English language tests
University of Cambridge examinations